Samuel David Jimenez, professionally known as Smash David, is an American record producer and songwriter. He produced Big Sean's "Bounce Back" and "Pills & Automobiles" by Chris Brown from the Heartbreak on a Full Moon album.

Early life 
Samuel David Jimenez is Spanish, raised in Miami, Florida.

Career 
Smash David has worked with the artist and producers Khalid, Omarion, Dej Loaf, Kehlani, Jeremiah, Lil Wayne, Jason Derulo, Hitmaka and Metro Boomin. On February 25, 2017, his production for Big Sean’s song Bounce Back peaked at number 6 on the Billboard Hot 100 and went quadruple platinum by the Recording Industry Association of America (RIAA). He also received a certified Gold plaque for producing and co-writing Chris Brown’s Pills & Automobiles featuring Yo Gotti, A Boogie wit da Hoodie, and Kodak Black
 and a 5× platinum plaque for Location by Khalid.

Certifications and awards 
"Pills and Automobiles" by Chris Brown ft A Boogie, Yo Gotti, Kodak Black - certified Platinum by RIAA on January 5, 2018

"Bounce Back" by Big Sean - certified 4× Platinum by RIAA on August 10, 2018

"Location" by Khalid - certified 5× Platinum by RIAA on August 14, 2018

"B.I.D" by Tory Lanez - certified Gold by RIAA on September 21, 2018

"1942" by G-Eazy ft Yo Gotti and YBN Nahmir - certified Platinum by RIAA on January 30, 2019

Production credits

References

External links

 

Living people
People from Miami
Record producers from Florida
Year of birth missing (living people)